Ženski košarkaški klub Željezničar Sarajevo is a Bosnian women's basketball team from Sarajevo, Bosnia and Herzegovina.

History
In 1982. ŽKK Željezničar competed in the second division of Yugoslavia, with great success and without losing a match. the team was led by coach Miodrag Vesković, won first place and the club returned to the First division. With a very small selection of players in the 1983-84 season, the team was elected to the first division. The following season 1984-85, the team was joined by a pair of showgirls including the Vesna Bajkuša (showgirl youth branches ŽKK Željezničar), and achieved fourth place and thus won the right to contest the Cup Liliana Ronchetti. With inexperienced and very young players in the first round of the Montmontaža from Zagreb. The following season, the team again won the fourth place in the championship of Yugoslavia and then left the Cup Liliana Ronchetti, beating the representatives of Greece and Italy, but losing to representatives of Czechoslovakia, the team from the Slavia Prague sports club.

Honours

Domestic
National Championships – 14

Yugoslav League:
Winners (1) : 1971
Bosnian League:
Winners (13) : 1995, 1998, 1999, 2002, 2003, 2004, 2005, 2006, 2007, 2008, 2009, 2010, 2011

National Cups – 7

Yugoslav Cup:
Runners-up (2) : 1973, 1992
Bosnian Cup:
Winners (7) : 1998, 1999, 2003, 2004, 2005, 2006, 2007

International
International titles – 1
Adriatic League Women:
Winners (1) : 2003

Notable former players
Tima Džebo
Vesna Bajkuša
Olga Đoković

Notable former coaches
Miodrag Vesković
Vesna Bajkuša

External links
 
 ŽKK Željezničar Sarajevo on facebook.com
 ŽKK Željezničar Sarajevo on eurobasket.com

 
Women's basketball teams in Bosnia and Herzegovina
Sport in Sarajevo
Women's basketball teams in Yugoslavia
Basketball teams established in 1921